Friedrich Haag (20 August 1856 – 8 December 1941) was a pioneering German crystallographer.

An article written by Haag in the :de:Zeitschrift für Kristallographie (a German crystallography journal) was used by M. C. Escher in his study of tessellation.

References

External links
 :de:Friedrich Haag (Kristallograph) (on German Wikipedia)

Crystallographers
1856 births
1941 deaths